Michael John Stasko (born May 29, 1980) is a Canadian actor, film producer, film writer, film composer, film director and film editor.

Biography
Stasko graduated from the University of Windsor in Communication Studies with a concentration in Film, and later completed postgraduate studies at Sheridan College in Advanced Television and Film. He went on to complete an MFA in Film at Columbia University. His film credits include Things To Do (2006),  Iodine (2009), and The Birder (2013). He is currently a professor of Communication and Film studies at the University of Windsor.

External links

The New York Times Movies
https://web.archive.org/web/20071117020027/http://profile.myspace.com/index.cfm?fuseaction=user.viewprofile
http://www.dotfilms.ca/bios.html#ms
http://www.filmmakers.com/news/film_festivals/article_531.shtml
http://www.boston.com/ae/tv/blogcritics/dvd/2007/09/02-week/
http://jam.canoe.ca/Movies/2005/12/17/1357594.html

1980 births
Living people
Canadian male film actors
Canadian male television actors
Canadian male screenwriters
Film directors from Ontario
Male actors from Windsor, Ontario
Writers from Windsor, Ontario
21st-century Canadian screenwriters
21st-century Canadian male writers